Jean Vivra Gray (20 July 1924 – 29 July 2016), known professionally as Vivean Gray, also credited as Vivian Gray and Viven Gray, was an English television and film actress. She starred in the films  Picnic at Hanging Rock and The Last Wave, but her best-known roles were in TV soap operas, after having appeared in numerous roles for Crawford Productions, she had regular roles in serials, The Sullivans, as Ida Jessup for its entire run from 1976 to 1983; in Prisoner, as Edna Pearson 1984, and in Neighbours, as Nell Mangel from 1986 to 1988.

Gray left the acting profession in 1988, and returned to her native England to Shoreham-by-Sea, West Sussex, where she lived a quiet and private life.

Early life 
Gray was born in Cleethorpes, Lincolnshire, England on 20 July 1924. Gray was the daughter of Allan Gray and Doris (nee Simpson), who had been married the previous year in Grimsby, Lincolnshire. She was the eldest of four children. Her father was a fish and chip shop owner at Grimsby Docks, and, just before WW2, the family moved to New Malden in Surrey where he owned the newly built Fish and Chip shop at 12, The Triangle.

She initially worked as a local reporter, photographer's assistant and as a sales assistant in a department store, and later became a nurse, and served with the Women's Land Army. In 1952 she visited Australia on holiday. Her acting career stemmed from work with an amateur theatrical group.

Career 
In the 1970s, Gray appeared in a number of television dramas produced by Crawford Productions including Solo One, Bluey, Homicide, Division 4, Matlock Police, and Carson's Law. She also appeared in film portraying mathematics teacher Miss Greta McCraw in Peter Weir's adaptation of Picnic at Hanging Rock (1975) and in the television mini-series Anzacs and All the Rivers Run.

She worked with Weir again in 1977 in his film The Last Wave, playing the role of Aboriginal history expert Dr. Whitburn.

The Sullivans 
Gray played Ida Jessop in the soap opera The Sullivans for its 16-season run from 1976 to 1983, winning two Logie Awards for her portrayal of the gossipy neighbour.

Prisoner 
She appeared in serial Prisoner (known internationally as Prisoner: Cell Block H), as genteel poisoner Edna Pearson in 1984, in a seven-episode arc. After the initial showing of her episodes in Australia, a woman from South Australia named Emily Gertrude Phyllis Perry claimed the story was based on her real life experience of being accused of poisoning her husband Kenneth Warwick Henry Perry, by putting small doses of arsenic in his food and threatened to sue the producers, Grundy Television stating defamation.

Perry became the central figure  in allegations by the Crown that she attempted to poison her husband, during a trial lasting 72 days in 1981, her husband had also maintained that his wife was innocent during the trial, however Perry was initially sentenced to serve 15 years, but the following year the decision was overturned by the High Court, and the Government did not seek a retrial. Grundy's had stated in media reports the story line was actually based on a 1953 case and not the Perry case. She subsequently decided not to sue the company, despite the story bearing many similarities to her case, even down to the character's initials.

As a result, any material that coincided with the woman's story was removed for subsequent episode screenings, including the full Australian DVD release of Prisoner. In 2010 a special DVD release of the full uncut "Edna" story was released, but only in the United Kingdom.

Neighbours 
In 1986, Gray was cast for three weeks in the role of "Nell" Mangel, better known as Mrs Mangel in the soap opera Neighbours. However, the character proved so popular that she remained on the show until 1988, appearing in 292 episodes. The character was known for her constant feuding with Madge Bishop, played by Anne Charleston, and vying for the affections of Harold Bishop, played by Ian Smith. Gray left the role after receiving abuse from fans who disliked the character, with producers relocating Mangel to St. Albans, with a retired dentist, to live a happy retirement. This was Gray's last acting role and she retired, returning to her native land and settling in Shoreham-by-Sea, West Sussex. In the soap’s later years, Gray still had an onscreen presence as the painting of Mrs Mangel was put back on display in the character’s home. For the show’s final weeks in 2022, old scenes and photos included Gray as Nell. In the UK, the last three episodes, which contained Gray in a flashback, aired on the 6th anniversary of her death (29 July 2022).

Later life and recognition 
Gray won two Logie Awards for her role as Ida Jessup in The Sullivans: in 1978 for Best Sustained Performance by an Actress in a Supporting Role, and in 1981 for Best Support Actress in a Series. In 1995, Gray was featured on an Australian postage stamp, depicting her role in Picnic at Hanging Rock.

Death 
Gray died on 29 July 2016, nine days after her 92nd birthday. She never married or had any children.

Filmography

Film

Television

References

External links 
 

1924 births
2016 deaths
Australian soap opera actresses
British emigrants to Australia
English television actresses
Logie Award winners
People from Cleethorpes
People from Surrey